Karjat taluka is a taluka in Raigad district of the Indian state of Maharashtra.

Officer

MLA
Mahendra Thorve

Sub-Divisional Officer

Tahasildar & Executive Magistrate

Tehsildar
Mr. Vikram Deshmukh

Prant Adhikari
MS. Vaishali Pardesi

Police commissioner

Sub-Division. Superintendent of Police. Karjat
Mr. Anil Gherdikar
Po.ni - Karjat Po.Ste. Po.N. 
Mr. Arun Rakhmaji Bhor
Po.ni - Neral Po.Ste. S.P.N.
Mr. Sanjay Shantaram Bangar

Chairperson & Deputy Chairperson Panchayat Samiti

Chairperson -
Smt. Sushma Tai Thackeray

Deputy Chairperson - 
Smt. Jaywanti Hindola

Chief Officer of Panchayat Samiti

Raigad district

As of August 2015, there were 8 sub-divisions, 15 talukas, 1970 villages, 60 revenue circles and 350 sazzas in Raigad district. The talukas being Alibag, Karjat, Khalapur, Mahad, Mangaon, Mhasala, 
Murud, Panvel, Pen, Poladpur, Roha, Shrivardhan, Sudhagad Pali, Tala and Uran.

References

Talukas in Maharashtra
Talukas in Raigad district